The 1977 Penn Quakers football team represented the University of Pennsylvania in the 1977 NCAA Division I football season.

Schedule

References

Penn
Penn Quakers football seasons
Penn Quakers football